Methods in Ecology and Evolution is a monthly peer-reviewed scientific journal covering methodologies in ecology  and evolution. It was established in 2010 and is the 5th journal of the British Ecological Society. It is published by Wiley-Blackwell on behalf of the British Ecological Society and the editors-in-chief are Aaron M. Ellison (Harvard University), Natalie Cooper (Natural History Museum), Nicolas Lecomte (Université de Moncton), and Huijie Qiao (Chinese Academy of Sciences).
In June 2022 it was announced that the journal would switch to a full open access publishing model from January 2023, with all papers submitted to the journal from 6 July 2022 open access on publication.

Abstracting and indexing
According to the Journal Citation Reports, the journal has a 2021 impact factor of 8.330.

See also
Journal of Ecology
Journal of Animal Ecology
Journal of Applied Ecology
Functional Ecology

References

External links 
 

Evolutionary biology journals
Ecology journals
Wiley-Blackwell academic journals
British Ecological Society academic journals
English-language journals
Monthly journals
Research methods journals